The 2011 Segunda División season was the 66th edition of the second tier of Federación Peruana de Futbol. The tournament was played on a home-and-away round-robin basis.

The season was divided into 2 stages. In the first stage the 10 teams played a round-robin home-and-away round for a total of 18 matches each. In the second stage the 10 teams were divided into 2 groups. The top 5 teams played in the group Liguilla Ascenso and the bottom 5 teams played in Liguilla Descenso. Each team carried on their records from the first stage.

On April 5, 2011, Total Chalaco withdrew before the start of the season.

Teams

First stage

Results

Second stage

Liguilla Ascenso

Results

Liguilla Descenso

Results

Relegation playoff

Top goalscorers
14 goals
 Wellington Adao (Coronel Bolognesi)
13 goals
 Fabricio Lenci (Sport Áncash)
10 goals
 Juan Carrillo (Sport Áncash)
8 goals
 Pedro Sanguinetti (Alianza Unicachi)
 Gustavo Vassallo (Universidad San Marcos)
6 goals
 César Goya (Hijos de Acosvinchos)
 Wilkin Cavero (U América)

References

External links
 RSSSF

2
2011
Peru